Daniel Sánchez (born 29 July 1968) is a Puerto Rican former wrestler who competed in the 1992 Summer Olympics and in the 1996 Summer Olympics.

References

External links
 

1968 births
Living people
Olympic wrestlers of Puerto Rico
Wrestlers at the 1992 Summer Olympics
Wrestlers at the 1996 Summer Olympics
Puerto Rican male sport wrestlers
Place of birth missing (living people)
American sportsmen